DASA (officially Deutsche Aerospace AG, later Daimler-Benz Aerospace AG, then DaimlerChrysler Aerospace AG) was a German aerospace manufacturer.

It was created during 1989 as the aerospace subsidiary arm of Daimler-Benz AG (later DaimlerChrysler) from 1989. The company acquired rival manufacturer Messerschmitt-Bölkow-Blohm (MBB) that same year, integrating it along with its other aerospace interests, MTU München, and Dornier Flugzeugwerke, by 1992.

The company's existence was relatively brief due to the peace dividend of the 1990s having motivated industry-wide consolidation. During July 2000, DASA merged with Aérospatiale-Matra of France and Construcciones Aeronáuticas SA (CASA) of Spain to form EADS, which has since rebranded itself as Airbus Group.

History

DASA (from Deutsche Aerospace Aktiengesellschaft) was founded on 19 May 1989 by the merger of Daimler-Benz's aerospace interests, MTU München, and Dornier Flugzeugwerke. During December 1989, Daimler-Benz acquired rival German aerospace consortium Messerschmitt-Bölkow-Blohm (MBB), merged it into DASA. During March 1990, Daimler-Benz initiated a major restructuring of the new group, integrating the previously separate companies into five product groups; Aircraft, Space Systems, Defense and Civil Systems/Propulsion. Several companies continued to exist under their own names but, by 1992, most (including MBB and TST) of the former entities had been fully integrated.

During 1992, DASA's helicopter portfolio, which had been largely inherited from MBB, was merged with the helicopter division of French manufacturer Aérospatiale to form Eurocopter. The Bo 108, DASA's in-development helicopter derived from MBB's highly successful Bo 105, was one of the assets transferred to the new company; it was launched as the Eurocopter EC135 during the early 1990s to considerable similar commercial success. By 2014, Eurocopter, which was subsequently rebranded as Airbus Helicopters, was a market leader in the field, operating four principal manufacturing plants in Europe (Marignane and La Courneuve in France, and Donauwörth and Kassel in Germany), plus 32 subsidiaries and participants around the world, including those in Brisbane, Australia, Albacete, Spain and Grand Prairie, USA. As of that same year, in excess of 12,000 helicopters built by the company were in service with over 3,000 customers across roughly 150 countries.

During the early 1990s, DASA became involved as a strategic partner of the Dutch aircraft manufacturer Fokker, the latter reportedly being interested in expanding its footprint in the regional aircraft sector. During 1993, it was announced that DASA purchased a 40 per cent stake in Fokker. However, by 1995, both Fokker and DASA were experiencing considerable financial difficulties, largely as a result of the extremely competitive nature of the regional market during this era. Fokker was forced to reduce production of its Fokker 50 airliner; and embark upon a major restructuring programme, including efforts to renegotiate prices with its suppliers, in what was viewed by aerospace publication Flight International as a last-ditch effort to save the company. During January 1996, DASA's board decided to distance the company from the struggling Fokker. At one stage, DASA had agreed to provide a rescue deal for the company, but this had been contingent upon a commitment by the Dutch government.

The poor state of the company's finances heavily contributed to DASA's decision to depart the regional aircraft market entirely. According, during June 1996, it was announced that DASA had sold the majority of the assets of its former Dornier division to American aviation company Fairchild Aircraft, leading to the creation of Fairchild Dornier. Furthermore, that same year, DASA announced that all manufacturing operations for the Dornier 228 would be transferred to Hindustan Aeronautics Limited (HAL) of India; two years later, activity on the German production line was permanently terminated. These moves were intended to concentrate the company's resources on the production of the larger Dornier 328 airliner, as well as to respond to Dornier's wider financial difficulties.

On 1 January 1995, the company announced that it had changed its name to Daimler-Benz Aerospace AG. As a consequence of the peace dividend of the 1990s following the dissolution of the Soviet Union, industry-wide consolidation increased. Following the merger of parent company Daimler Benz with American car manufacturer Chrysler Corporation during 1998, the company was renamed DaimlerChrysler Aerospace AG on 7 November 1998. Management and politicians alike remained keen to form partnerships with other European companies in the aerospace and defense sectors. On 10 July 2000, it was announced that DASA (minus MTU) had formally merged with Aérospatiale-Matra of France and Construcciones Aeronáuticas SA (CASA) of Spain to form the European Aeronautic Defence and Space Company (EADS). Following the merger, the former DaimlerChrysler Aerospace division initially operated as EADS Deutschland GmbH; following the rebranding of EADS as Airbus Group, the division was formally rebranded as Airbus Defence and Space GmbH.

Major projects

Immediately upon its creation, DASA was associated with several ongoing aircraft programmes, including the multinational Eurofighter Typhoon fighter programme, the Panavia Tornado fighter-bomber, along with various other initiatives and partnerships. The company's work on the Tornado was largely conducted via Panavia Aircraft GmbH, a tri-national consortium consisting of British Aerospace (previously British Aircraft Corporation), Aeritalia of Italy, and DASA, having inherited MBB's involvement. Under this arrangement, DASA manufactured the Tornado's central fuselage on behalf of all international customers while the other partners manufactured the rest of the airframe. DASA's subsidiary MTU also held a 40 per cent stake in the Tornado's engine manufacturer Turbo-Union, a separate multinational company formed to develop and build the RB199 engines for the aircraft. Production of the Tornado was terminated during 1998; the final batch of aircraft being produced was delivered to the Royal Saudi Air Force, who had ordered a total of 96 IDS Tornados. DASA was also responsible for the mid life upgrade (MLU) of the German fleet of Panavia Tornados, similar to the RAF's GR4 upgrade.

During the 1990s, the Eurofighter proceeded towards the mass production phase, DASA holding a workshare stake in the programme. The workshare split had originally been agreed at 33/33/21/13 (United Kingdom/Germany/Italy/Spain) based on the number of units being ordered by each contributing nations. However, following order cuts during the peace dividend following the collapse of the Soviet Union, the programme's workshare split was renegotiated as 43% for EADS MAS in Germany and Spain; 37.5% for BAE Systems in the UK; and 19.5% for Alenia. On 27 March 1994, the maiden flight of the Eurofighter prototype took place in Bavaria, flown by DASA chief test pilot Peter Weger. Production was divided into three tranches, these being a production/funding distinction without directly implying an incremental increase in capability with each tranche. Tranche3 was later divided into A and B parts. In September 1998, contracts were signed for production of 148 Tranche1 aircraft and procurement of long lead-time items for Tranche2 aircraft. In March 2008, the final aircraft out of Tranche1 was delivered to the German Air Force, with all successive deliveries being at the Tranche2 standard or above.

Owing to its expertise with both German and NATO aircraft, DaimlerChrysler Aerospace provided various upgrade packages for a wide range of aircraft, such as the McDonnell Douglas F-4 Phantom II and the Boeing E-3 Sentry. During 1993, MiG Aircraft Support GmbH was established with DaimlerChrysler Aerospace holding a 50% stake. The company undertook the upgrade of the German Air Force's fleet of 24 MiG-29s to NATO standards. These fighters had been inherited from the former East Germany after the reunification of the country in 1991.

Aircraft

 Dornier 228
 Dornier 328
 Eurocopter AS355 Écureuil 2
 MBB Bo 105
 MBB Bo 108 - became the Eurocopter EC 135
 MBB/Kawasaki BK 117
 MBB F-104G/CCV (CCV Program)

Partnerships
 Airbus A300
 Airbus A310
 Airbus A320 family
 Eurofighter Typhoon
 Fokker 50
 Fokker 70
 Fokker 100
 MPC 75
 Panavia Tornado
 Rockwell-MBB X-31

References

Citiations

Bibliography

 
 Jackson, Paul, Kenneth Munson, Lindsay Peacock and John W. R. Taylor, eds. Jane's All The World's Aircraft 1997–98. London: Jane's Information Group, 1998. .

External links

 About Daimler-Benz Aerospace

Defunct aircraft manufacturers of Germany
Defunct helicopter manufacturers of Germany
Mercedes-Benz Group